Academia Mexicana, in English Mexican Academy, may refer to:

 Academia Mexicana de Arquitectura
 Academia Mexicana de Artes y Ciencias Cinematográficas
 Academia Mexicana de Ciencias
 Academia Mexicana de Diseño
 Academia Mexicana de Ilustración Científica
 Academia Mexicana de la Historia
 Academia Mexicana de la Lengua